The 16th Robert Awards ceremony was held in 1999 in Copenhagen, Denmark. Organized by the Danish Film Academy, the awards honoured the best in Danish and foreign film of 1998.

Honorees

Best Danish Film 
 Festen – Thomas Vinterberg

Best Screenplay 
 Thomas Vinterberg & Mogens Rukov – Festen

Best Actor in a Leading Role 
 Ulrich Thomsen – Festen

Best Actress in a Leading Role 
 Bodil Jørgensen – Idioterne

Best Actor in a Supporting Role 
 Thomas Bo Larsen – Festen

Best Actress in a Supporting Role 
 Birthe Neumann – Festen

Best Cinematography 
 Anthony Dod Mantle – Festen

Best Production Design 
 Thomas Ravn – Skyggen

Best Costume Design 
 Ingrid Søe –

Best Makeup 
 Jeanne Müller –

Best Special Effects 
 Hans Peter Ludvigsen –

Best Sound Design 
 Per Streit – Heart of Light

Best Editing 
 Valdis Oskarsdottir – Festen

Best Score 
  – Heart of Light

Best Documentary Short 
  – Bente Milton

Best Short Featurette 
  – Louise Andreasen

Non-American Film 
 My Name Is Joe – Ken Loach

Best American Film 
 The Truman Show – Peter Weir

See also 

 1999 Bodil Awards

References

Sources

External links 
  

1998 film awards
1999 in Denmark
Robert Awards ceremonies
1990s in Copenhagen